De Kiekeboes is a comic strip series created by Belgian artist Merho in 1977. The series appears in Dutch. It is first published in the newspapers Gazet van Antwerpen and Het Belang van Limburg and then published as comic books by Standaard Uitgeverij. The series is the best-selling comic in Flanders, but is unsuccessful abroad, with only a few publications in French and English.

History
De Kiekeboes debuted in 1977. Merho had previously worked with Willy Vandersteen but wanted to create his own series. The first story, De Wollebollen, started in Het Laatste Nieuws. on 15 February 1977.

New albums in the series appear every three months, and sell over 100,000 copies each. Like most Flemish comic strips, De Kiekeboes comics are steady sellers, with most of the series available for sale at any one time. New titles are the best selling comics in Flanders, with some 80,000 copies sold in the first year of publication. In 2007, only the Dutch translation of the final Harry Potter book sold more copies.

After being assisted for a while by Dirk Stallaert, Merho announced that from 1 January 2006 on, the comics would be drawn by Steve Van Bael and Thomas Du Caju, who would each produce two comics a year. Merho continues to write the stories and to make early sketches. In October 2007 Kristof Fagard had to take over from Steve Van Bael and continued in tandem with Thomas Du Caju as pencilers.

To celebrate the thirtieth anniversary of the comic strip in 2007, an exposition was held in the Belgian Centre for Comic Strip Art and a wall painting was unveiled in Antwerp. Statues of Kiekeboe and of his daughter Fanny are placed in Middelkerke. Another statue of Kiekeboe can be found in Halle-Zoersel.

Style
The creator Merho having started his career in Willy Vandersteen's studio, it was only natural for his own Kiekeboe series to follow up on those traditions, especially the best-known Suske en Wiske. Soon however, the horizon widened: contrary to his peer, Merho never applied a time machine, setting all stories in very recognisable contemporary places and atmospheres. On the contrary, themes would include actuality, up to and including social controversies like sex in general and non-conformist sexuality in particular, but also the consumption of and trade in drugs, laundering of crime money (#70), corruption of politicians (#77), and more. The Kiekeboe series can thus be said to, on the one hand, continue the tradition of Flemish family comic strips like Nero, Jommeke, Piet Pienter en Bert Bibber and Suske en Wiske within the larger picture of the Belgian Comic tradition, yet on the other hand open up to a wider view on contemporary society and politics, adapting the genre to the 21st century. On top of that, the author Merho indulges in experiments with the technicalities and limitations of the comic strip genre and medium, especially in #26. Neither does he neglect referring to the French-language counterparts in multi-lingual Belgium, Tintin and the publishers getting particular attention.

Characters
Ordered by approximate number of appearances.
 Marcel Kiekeboe: protagonist of the comic book series, sort of an 'average Joe' with a non-descript average office job, attracts adventure and goes along with it. Thinks quite good of himself, but repeatedly turns out to be the least smart of the family.
 Charlotte Kiekeboe: Marcel's wife, housewife, often (mostly unwillingly) joining the adventures. She's smarter and more composed than Marcel and this usually helps the family getting out of trouble. She's ever distrustful of Firmin Van De Kasseien, who always uses Kiekeboe to settle his difficult situations, either relational or business-related.
 Fanny Kiekeboe: their daughter, around 20 years old. Socially engaged (feminism, animal rights,...), self-conscious, sexy and adventurous, she often gets in trouble. Before the 100th album, she had a new boyfriend in almost every story. After that, she was in some more or less steady relationships.
 Konstantinopel Kiekeboe: their son, extremely smart (certainly in the first stories), in primary school. Sometimes a troublemaker, sometimes cautious, always clever.
 The fat lady: recurring extra, appears in at least one image of every album, but never has any role of significance (though she does sometimes have an influence).
Jens: a professional stuntman and boyfriend of Fanny in a solid relationship around the 100th albums. Until Fanny breaks up with him. He continues to appear now and then, in recent albums, and tries to help Fanny when she's in trouble. However, Fanny also ends up saving Jens quite often.
 Leon Van Der Neffe: neighbour of the Kiekeboe family, professional soldier but not at all a war veteran, ill-tempered and paranoid. Big enemy of Marcel - but never the 'bad guy'. On occasion, Kiekeboe and Van Der Neffe even collaborate (#12, #15). His name means (in the Antwerp patois) "next door guy".
 Carmella Van Der Neffe: Leon Van Der Neffe's (ex-)wife.
 Joeksel and Froefroe: Leon and Carmella Van Der Neffe's children, friends with Konstantinopel, much to the dislike of their fathers. Like many early characters, they have their names derived from the Antwerp dialect: Joeksel standing for itching, whereas Froefroe refers to the bangs haircut style - which she prominently displays.
 Fernand Goegebuer: another neighbour of the Kiekeboe family, all-around good guy, meddlesome fool, spits as he speaks. His name stands for "good neighbour" in shrill contrast to Van Der Neffe.
 Jozefien "Moemoe" Kiekeboe: Marcel's mother, always complaining about/to him and talking about the 'adventures' of her (never shown) best friend Mrs. Stokvis. Worse than the archetypal "mother in law" by the author's own word.
 Inspecteur Sapperdeboere: Inspector of local police, is more interested in food than in his cases, which is why the main family has to solve them themselves.
 Firmin Van De Kasseien: Marcel's boss, constantly has extramarital affairs with young beautiful women, often his "secretary"; and often needs Marcel to keep them hidden.
 Balthazar: 'self-employed' thief, 'the only burglar in the golden pages', tries to do small crimes but constantly fails.
 Mevrouw Stokvis: unseen best friend of Moemoe, even when the story revolves around her (#56), it's because she 'disappears' and she is not seen.
 Dédé La Canaille: French criminal, is caught because of Marcel and subsequently wants to kill him whenever he regains his freedom (similar to Sideshow Bob).
 Mona: old love of Marcel, until she gets bitten by a vampire and becomes a sexy vampirewoman, tries to seduce Marcel every time she shows up.
 Timothea Triangl: short, transgender 'master'-criminal.
 Nonkel Vital: Marcel's uncle, brother of Marcel's father, lives in the countryside; arch-enemy of Moemoe.
 Leo Van Der Neffe: Leon Van Der Neffe's twin brother, works as a prison guard.

Titles

De Wollebollen
De duivelse driehoek
De dorpstiran van Boeloe Boeloe
De onthoofde sfinx
Tegen de sterren op
Kiekeboe in Carré
De schat van Mata Hari
De Haar-Tisten
De zwarte Zonnekoning    
De doedelzak van Mac Reel
Spoken in huis
De Trawanten van Spih
Kies Kiekeboe
Een zakje chips
Mysterie op Spell-Deprik
Meesterwerken bij de vleet
Fanny Girl
Bing Bong 
Geeeeef acht!
De Ka-Fhaar
De pili-pili pillen
De omgekeerde piramide
De snor van Kiekeboe
De anonieme smulpapen
Het plan SStoeffer 
Album 26
De getatoeëerde mossel
Over koetjes en kalfjes
De zoete regen
Het lot van Charlotte
Klavertje vier
Het edelweissmotief
De een zijn dood
De zaak Luc Raak
Kiekeboeket
Het witte bloed
Jeanne Darm
Prettige feestdagen
De fez van Fes
Villa Delfia
De bende van Moemoe
De spray-historie
De spookfirma
Hotel O
Een koud kunstje
Konstantinopel in Istanboel
De taart
Black-out
De Medusa-stichting
Afgelast wegens ziekte
Met de Franse slag
De wraak van Dédé
De roze Rolls
Gedonder om de bliksem
Schiet niet op de pianist
Het Stokvis-incident
Zeg het met bloemen
Haaiman
De kus van Mona
Het gat in de kaas
De zes sterren
Doorgestoken kaart
Moet er nog sneeuw zijn
De onweerstaanbare man
De comeback van Dédé
De hoofdzaak
Het geslacht Kinkel
Thantomthant
Zand erover
Witter dan wit
King Sacha
Het Zipan-project
Hoe meer kijkers
De wereld volgens Kiekeboe
Het idee van Dédé
Kiekebanus (this album also belongs to the series of Urbanus)
Drempelvrees
Havana Gilla
Kunst en vliegwerk
De babyvampier
Blond en blauw
De aqua-rel
Lang zullen ze leven
Het lijk had gelijk
In het spoor van Dédé
Misstoestanden
De Simstones
De hoed van Robin
De S van Pion
Black e-mail
De affaire Chichi
De Heeren van Scheurbuyck
In tweevoud
Taxi Comitée
Alles kitsch
De Incabouter
Kielekiele Boe
Verkeerd verbonden
Mona, de musical
99 Plus
In vuur en vlam
De potloodmummie
Heil Bod 
De Himbagodin
Het Boerka Complot
Vrolijke vrolijke vrienden
Tiznoland
De DT fout
Een echte Vitalko
Baas boven baas
Dédé bij nacht
En in kwade dagen
De wokchinees
Bij verdiensten
Het boemerangeffect 
Boek.Bv 
Drie bollen met slagroom
Kort en bondig
Geld terug
Joyo De Eerste
De Kangoeroeclub
Doodeenvoudig / Eenvoudig dood
Vluchtmisdrijf
Stinkend rijk
Vrouwen komen van Mars (originally: En seks natuurlijk)
Tienduizend dagen
De Pepermunten
Nood in Macadamia
Grof Wild
Het SS-Syndroom
Omtrent Oscar
Alle Eendjes
Een dagje Dédé
Schatjes op zolder
Code E
Schijnheilig bloed
Bistro Dodo
Geen rook
Zonder vuur
Bubbelspel
De dode brievenbus
Tot op de bodem
De truken van Defhoor 
Losse flodders
Wie A zegt 
Alibaberg
Gebroken zwart
Nepwerk
Zo zie je maar 
K4
Dédé en partner
Niet van gisteren
Achteraf bekeken
Iemand moet het doen
In troebel water
"Blauwblauw"
"De butler heeft het gedaan"
"Salami"
"Onvervalst vals"

Special release
Kiekeboe Down Under

Rides
De Kiekeboes has a simulator ride with set pieces drawn and coloured by Kristof Fagard that is located at Comics Station in Antwerp.The animation from the droptower ride was animated by Kristof Fagard and Tom Metdepenningen.

Notes

External links 
 Official site

Belgian comics titles
Belgian comic strips
Belgian comics characters
Comics characters introduced in 1977
Humor comics
Adventure comics
1977 comics debuts
Fictional families
Fictional characters from Flanders
Belgian comics adapted into films
Comics about married people
Comics adapted into plays
Comics set in Belgium
Comic franchises
Works set in Flanders